Lequecahue Airport is an airport  south of Tirúa, a Pacific coastal town in the Bío Bío Region of Chile.

See also

Transport in Chile
List of airports in Chile

References

External links
OpenStreetMap - Tirúa
OurAirports - Lequecahue
FallingRain - Lequecahue Airport

Airports in Chile
Airports in Biobío Region